Marina Raphael (born Marina Rafail-Vogiatzakis in 1998) is a sixth-generation member of the Swarovski family and a fashion designer. As the latter, she designs and produces handbags both for her eponymous brand Marina Raphael and Swarovski. In 2022, her work for both brands saw her listed amongst Forbes Europe's 30 Under 30 in its Arts & Culture category.

Early life and education 
Born and raised in Athens to a Greek father and Swiss-Austrian mother, Raphael is a sixth-generation descendant of Swarovski founder Daniel Swarovski. She graduated with an International Baccalaureate from St. Catherine's British School prior to completing a bachelor’s degree in Business Management at King's College London.

Career 

Raphael founded her handbag label Marina Raphael in 2017,  launching it in 2018 in parallel with her university studies. Serving as its designer and CEO, the label’s pieces are produced in Florence, Italy with quality-control outsourced to Swarovski in Austria.  Marina Raphael handbags are stocked by the likes of Harrods, Harvey Nichols, LuisaViaRoma, and Moda Operandi.

Since 2020, Raphael's brand has collaborated with a number of third-party designers and companies including L'Oréal’s Vichy Laboratories, for whom Raphael also served as the face of the company's Greek advertising campaigns, influencer Evangelie Smyrniotaki, and creative director and sustainability consultant Doina Ciobanu. Her work with the latter saw the Marina Raphael brand release its first sustainable collection of handbags which utilise a form of vegan leather developed as a byproduct of the industrial processing of apples. Similarly, a collaboration between Raphael and Swarovski announced in 2020 saw the designer and Swarovski Group’s Global Creative Director, Giovanna Battaglia Engelbert, collaborate on the design and production of the first handbag line to be released under the Swarovski marque in the jeweller’s 125 year history. In 2022, Raphael's brand was projecting that it would double its sales to reach revenues of US$2.6 million.

References

1998 births
Living people
21st-century businesswomen
Businesspeople from Athens